Lecturer Paul Kuniaki Maruyama (born October 27, 1941 in Tokyo) was a member of the first American team to compete in judo in the Summer Olympics. Judo was first included in the 1964 Summer Olympics in Tokyo.

Maruyama  was born in Kugayama, Tokyo, in 1941, son of Kunio Maruyama and his nisei wife, Mary Takeda. He is a graduate of San José State University (B.S.) and of University of Hawaii (M.B.A.). He was the United States national champion in the 154 pound weight class in 1966, 1970 and 1975, and placed second in the open weight class in 1966. At the 1964 Summer Olympics he was eliminated in the quarter-finals of the lightweight competition after losing to gold medalist Takehide Nakatani. He was the coach of the United States judo team for the 1980 Summer Olympics, boycotted by the United States, and for the 1984 Summer Olympics.

Maruyama went on to teach martial arts and Japanese language at the United States Air Force Academy, and served as president of the Japan-America Society of Southern Colorado. He teaches Japanese language and Asian Studies at Colorado College.  He is a lifelong friend with former teammate, politician Ben Nighthorse Campbell.

Bibliography
 Escape from Manchuria 2nd Edition (Urlink Print & Media, LLC, March 12, 2020)  &

See also
Ben Nighthorse Campbell (1964 teammate)
George Harris (1964 teammate)
James Bregman (1964 teammate)
Yosh Uchida (Olympic team coach)

References
 Nishioka, Hayward (2000) Judo: Heart and Soul Ohara Publications.  
 profile

1941 births
Living people
American male judoka
Judoka at the 1964 Summer Olympics
Olympic judoka of the United States
Sportspeople from Colorado Springs, Colorado
San Jose State University alumni
Sportspeople from Tokyo
Japanese emigrants to the United States
American sportspeople of Japanese descent
Pan American Games medalists in judo
Pan American Games silver medalists for the United States
Judoka at the 1963 Pan American Games
Medalists at the 1963 Pan American Games
20th-century American people
21st-century American people